The Ellis R. Lippincott Award is awarded annually to recognize "an individual who has made significant contributions to vibrational spectroscopy as judged by his or her influence on other scientists."
It was jointly established in 1975 by The Optical Society, The Coblentz Society, and The Society for Applied Spectroscopy.  The award honors Ellis R. Lippincott, a vibrational spectroscopist who worked at the University of Maryland.  Lippincott was one of the developers of the Diamond anvil cell, which is used in high pressure research.

Past winners of the Lippincott Award

2022   Martin Zanni
2021   Rohit Bhargava
2020   Volker Deckert
2019   Ji-Xin Cheng
2018   Peter Hamm
2017   
2016   Thomas Elsaesser
2015   
2014   
2013   Xiaoliang Sunney Xie
2012   Keith A. Nelson
2011   Isao Noda 
2010   
2009 	Michael D. Fayer
2008 	
2007 	Jonathan Tennyson
2006 	Hai-Lung Dai
2005 	
2004 	
2003 	Shaul Mukamel
2002 	
2001 	Lester Andrews
2000 	Donald Levy
1999 	Mitsuo Tasumi
1998 	Takeshi Oka
1997 	Robin Hochstrasser
1996 	
1995 	Giacinto Scoles
1994 	Herbert L. Strauss
1993 	
1992 	Richard Saykally
1990 	Robert W. Field
1989 	Marilyn E. Jacox
1988 	Andreas C. Albrecht
1987 	C. Bradley Moore
1986 	Wolfgang Kaiser
1985 	
1984 	Jon T. Hougen
1983 	
1982 	
1981 	
1980 	George C. Pimentel
1979 	E. Bright Wilson
1978 	Bryce L. Crawford, Jr.
1977 	
1976 	Richard C. Lord

See also

 List of physics awards

References

Awards of Optica (society)
Spectroscopy